The Book of the Cock (alternatively the Ethiopic Book of the Cock or the Book of the Rooster; Geʽez: , መጽሐፈ፡ ዶርሆ፡;) is a Geʽez narrative of the passion of Jesus (a passion gospel). It was likely written in the fifth or sixth centuries and is based on an earlier version in Arabic or Greek. It has contemporary use among some Ethiopian Christians.

Description and contents 
The Book of the Cock is a Geʽez narrative of the passion of Jesus (a passion gospel). It was probably written in the 400s or 500s. It uses material from the four gospels (Mark, Luke, Matthew, and John) and various other sources.

It describes the final three days of Jesus's life, including a sequence where he reanimates a rooster who spies on Judas Iscariot plotting his betrayal of Jesus. The rooster tells Jesus and his disciples of the plan. Among other events, it describes John the Evangelist witnessing the crucifixion of Jesus, the conversations Jesus has with two thieves he is crucified alongside – Gestas (Awsēmobyā) and Demas (Salikonilidākki) – and various other miracles Jesus performed during his life. The rooster may be based on the Ziz of Jewish mythology, a giant bird. Like the Gospel of Judas from the second century, it attempts to explain the betrayal of Judas before the Last Supper – an act which is traditionally seen as abrupt or lacking reason.

History and cultural importance 
In the nineteenth century, the rooster sequence was thought to be a complete story; in 1985, biblical scholar Roger Crowley wrote that it was a sequence within a larger narrative.

In the Christian community in Ethiopia, biblical scholar Pierluigi Piovanelli describes the Book of the Cock as a "quasi-canonical" book with prominent contemporary use. Over half of the existing manuscripts of the text (or manuscripts preserving a portion of the text) reside in Ethiopian libraries, and it has been used alongside other Christian texts in Ethiopian Holy Week activities.

Notes and references

Notes

Citations

Works cited

 
 
 
 
 
 

5th-century Christian texts
New Testament apocrypha
Passion Gospels
Texts in Ge'ez